The Arundel Head is a Hellenistic bronze portrait of a dramatist or king from Asia Minor, now kept in the British Museum. Dating to the 2nd-1st centuries BC, the head once belonged to (and takes its name from) the famous English collector of classical antiquities, Thomas Howard, 21st Earl of Arundel.

Description
The head is all that remains of a life-size bronze statue. The artist has realistically conveyed the worn features of an old man, including a wrinkled forehead, almond-shaped eyes and pouting mouth, which gives the portrait an air of power and authority.  The hair of this bronze masterpiece is tied down in a ribbon, which suggests it may have portrayed a poet. Once thought to represent the ancient Greek writer Homer, it is currently considered to personify either the ancient Greek playwright Sophocles or a Macedonian King.

Provenance
Recent research has suggested that the Arundel Head may have originally been found in Smyrna, the ancient name for Izmir in Turkey. The bronze sculpture was brought to England from Constantinople in the early seventeenth century as part of the collection of Thomas Howard, 21st Earl of Arundel. Subsequently, it came into the possession of Dr Richard Mead and later Brownlow Cecil, 9th Earl of Exeter, who donated it to the British Museum in 1760, making it one of the earliest pieces of classical antiquities to enter the national collection.

Gallery

References

Further reading
Henry Beauchamp Walters: British Museum. Select bronzes, Greek, Roman, and Etruscan, in the Departments of Antiquities, London 1915
C.C. Mattusch, Classical bronzes (Cornell University Press, 1996)
S. Walker, Greek and Roman portraits (London, The British Museum Press, 1995)
L. Burn, The British Museum book of Greek and Roman Art, revised edition (London, The British Museum Press, 1999)

Ancient Greek and Roman sculptures in the British Museum
Statues
Bronze sculptures in the United Kingdom
Hellenistic sculpture